The Rally Italia Sardegna (until 2010 Rally d'Italia Sardegna) is a rally competition in Sardinia, Italy, which has been a round of the World Rally Championship (WRC) schedule and also the Intercontinental Rally Challenge (IRC).

Characteristics

The rally is held on narrow, twisty, sandy and bumpy mountain roads around the town of Alghero or Olbia. The Italian round of the World Rally Championship was previously the Rallye Sanremo, held first as a mixed surface event and later on asphalt roads around the resort of Sanremo, but Rally d'Italia Sardegna replaced it in the WRC schedule from the 2004 season.

The 2008 event was held from 15 to 18 May 2008 and the latest stage, Liscia Ruja (2.69 km, near the five-star hotel in Cala di Volpe, well known as James Bond's favourite resort), was broadcast live. The 2010 rally was the first running of the event under IRC rules and four stages were also broadcast live by Eurosport.

Winners

Non-WRC events denotes in italics

Multiple winners

External links

 
Sport in Sardinia
Sardegna
Recurring sporting events established in 2004
Italy